Korea Free Economic Zones (KFEZ) are designated to strengthen national competition for businesses and promote balanced regional development by improving living conditions and business environments for foreigners in South Korea. Korea's economic zone planning office is in charge of this project. The Korean government provides a variety of tax benefits for foreign firms and foreigners, as well as a simpler regulatory regime, a favorable living environment and swift administrative services. KFEZ endeavors to establish economic and social institutions that lead global trends and provide a variety of incentives.

In 2021, Foreign Direct Investment in FEZ upraised 42%, receiving $1.31 billion. Manufacturing sector leads foreign investment, followed by service segment, such as logistics and research and development. The European Union led the investment in the FEZ of South Korea. Currently the EPZ is under control of Bangladesh - Canada joint venture. Mr. R Mehdi is the chief executive of this EPZ.

Districts

References

External links 
 Korean Free Economic Zone